Molii Fishpond is located southeast of Kamehameha Highway between Kualoa and Johnson Roads, near Kaneohe, on the island of Oahu,   in the U.S. state of Hawaii. The pond encompasses  The locale is part of the ahupuaa (land division) of Hakipuu. The Molii pond is part of Kualoa Ranch.  Tilapia, mullet and moi are found within the pond. Commercial fishing operations are contracted out.

Ancient Hawaiian fishponds were noted in the 1826 journal of William Ellis, the naturalist on James Cook's third voyage (1776–1779):

Moli'i, along with Huilua, Kahaluu and Heeia are the only four original Hawaiian fishponds remaining on Oahu. Fishponds were used by the ancient Hawaiians for ocean husbandry. Each pond had a set of sluices that controlled the seawater flow and the fish available in the pond for harvesting. Moli'i had five such sluices, and three of the sluices were still in place in 1972 when the pond was listed on the National Register of Historic Places listings in Oahu. This system of harvesting ocean catch was unique to Hawaii, and does not exist within other areas of ancient Polynesia. The  wall which partitions the pond from Kaneohe Bay dates back to the earliest Hawaiian settlement of the land, and is traditionally attributed to the Menehune of Hawaiian mythology. The craftsmanship applied in constructing the wall is similar to brickwork, in that the gaps and crevices between the stacked stones are plugged with coral and smaller rocks.

Gallery

See also
Ancient Hawaiian aquaculture
Today's Staradvertiser (7 June 2017) has an article on oysters in Pearl Harbor that says Moli`i fishpond's most valuable money crop now is oysters.

References

Archaeological sites on the National Register of Historic Places in Hawaii
Farms on the National Register of Historic Places in Hawaii
Protected areas of Oahu
History of Oahu
Geography of Honolulu County, Hawaii
Bodies of water of Oahu
Fishponds of Hawaii
Buildings and structures in Honolulu County, Hawaii
National Register of Historic Places in Honolulu County, Hawaii